Nathan Riggs M.D., F.A.C.S., is a fictional character from the medical drama television series Grey's Anatomy, which has aired on the American Broadcasting Company (ABC) in the United States. The character was created by series producer Shonda Rhimes and is portrayed by actor Martin Henderson. He was introduced in the episode "The Me Nobody Knows" as a cardiothoracic surgeon who had worked overseas with April Kepner during her time in Jordan. After bringing a patient to Grey-Sloan Memorial, he begins working there as an attending under Maggie Pierce. At the hospital, he begins a romantic relationship with Meredith Grey, now a widow after the death of Derek Shepherd, until his missing fiancée, Megan Hunt, is found and brought home. Nathan makes his last appearance in the episode "Danger Zone" when he and Megan start their life anew with her son in Los Angeles. It is revealed in Season 18 by Megan that the couple broke up.

Storylines 
Nathan Riggs is introduced in the sixth episode of the show's twelfth season as a new cardio attending at Grey-Sloan Memorial. It is quickly learned that he and Owen Hunt (Kevin McKidd) had been friends, but that their friendship ended acrimoniously. It is later revealed that Nathan and Owen's feud was caused by the disappearance of Owen's sister, Megan. Megan, who had been engaged to Nathan at the time of her abduction, had discovered Nathan's infidelity before running off and ultimately getting kidnapped. Owen has long blamed Riggs for the fate of his sister, who has been presumed dead for 10 years now. However, as time goes on, Nathan and Owen learn to work together and eventually reinstate their friendship.

Towards the end of Season 12, Nathan sleeps with Meredith Grey (Ellen Pompeo) in the back of her car. After the incident, they agree that it was a one-time thing, as Meredith still has trouble moving on from her late husband, Derek Shepherd (Patrick Dempsey). Meredith also learns that her half-sister, Maggie Pierce (Kelly McCreary), has developed a crush on Nathan, further separating Nathan and Meredith. Still, Nathan continues to pursue Meredith, and although she resists, they eventually begin a relationship after sleeping together again. The two stay together for some time, but just when things are on the verge of getting serious, Megan is found in the Season 13 finale. Meredith sends Nathan off to Megan, insisting that she would have done the same thing had it been Derek. Nathan and Megan initially have trouble resuming their relationship, as she believes that he is still in love with Meredith, but they finally get back together when he brings her son, Farouk, to her from Iraq, proving his loyalty to her. In "Danger Zone", Nathan moves to Los Angeles with Megan and Farouk to start their lives together.

Departure
Nathan made his last appearance in the season 14 episode "Danger Zone". The episode was designed as the departure for series regular Martin Henderson, having joined the cast in 2015 and conceived originally as the love-interest for Meredith.

Shonda Rhimes announced the exit of Martin Henderson as Nathan Riggs via Twitter: "I loved that we were able to give Riggs a happy ending worthy of his character and talent. As for Martin, this is not an ending for our relationship. He has been part of the Shondaland family since the pilot of Inside The Box and he will always be family. I can't wait to find a new project to work with him on in the future." Henderson indicated in an interview with Deadline that his departure was a storytelling based decision, as he was given a "short-term contract", adding, "This [was] my final year so I was expecting Nathan's storyline to be wrapped up."

Henderson shared his thoughts on his relationships with both Megan and Meredith
I think there was clearly something for Nathan in those relationships. Feelings like that, I don't think they go away. The nature of his previous commitment to Megan and his feelings around that put him in a horrible state of having to choose between two people he cares about, but honoring his commitment to Megan and following through on that is the right thing to do. It doesn't negate his feelings for Meredith. The complications of Meredith's emotions, the loss of Derek and moving on from that still plagues her. And there's as much ambiguity around all those feelings. The two of them found each other and that provided good drama. I feel bad for fans who were keen on Meredith and Nathan making it, and not being privy to where each character would go. It's hard to hear those outpourings from those who didn't know it was going to end up like this. But it makes for nice drama and it's something that Shonda does brilliantly: Dashing people's hopes and expectations. That's why the show continues to be successful. You can't predict what will happen to people at any time.

References

External links 

Grey's Anatomy characters
Television characters introduced in 2015
Fictional immigrants to the United States
Fictional cardiothoracic surgeons
Male characters in television